USS Marathon may refer to the following ships of the United States Navy:

 , was an attack transport commissioned 28 October 1944
 , was a patrol craft commissioned 11 May 1968

United States Navy ship names